Kunshan Football Club, or simply Kunshan F.C., is a professional Chinese association football club based in Kunshan, Jiangsu, China. They currently participate in the Chinese Super League, under licence from the Chinese Football Association (CFA). Their home stadium is the 30,000 capacity Kunshan Stadium. The club was founded on 12 December 2014 as an amateur membership club called Zhenjiang Huasa F.C. before moving to Kunshan where the Kunshan Municipal Party Committee and Municipal Government became their majority shareholders.

History
Zhenjiang Huasa, whose members are mainly the fans of FC Barcelona in China, was founded on 12 December 2014. Huasa, meaning Chinese Barca, was used as the club's name. They played in the 2016 China Amateur Football League and won the winners of 2016 Jiangsu Provincial Football League. Zhenjiang Huasa finished the 6th place in the national finals and won promotion to 2017 China League Two.
In December 2018, Zhenjiang Huasa moved to Kunshan and changed their name to Kunshan F.C.. With the support of the Kunshan Municipal Party Committee and Municipal Government as well as private financing the club were able to gain stability, improve their position to ninth and gain a total of 80310 fans with the highest average attendance of 5534 at the end of the 2019 league season. While the club finished in ninth at the end of the season they were granted promotion to the second tier, due to the expansion of the league and disbandment of Tianjin Tianhai. 

In their debut season within the second tier, the clubs Head, Gao Yao was able to guide the team to a third place finish, however unable to improve upon these results  in the following season he was let go by the club on 16 September 2021 and replaced by Sergio Zarco Díaz. In the 2022 China League One campaign, Sergio was able to gain promotion to the top tier for the first time in the clubs history by winning the division with the highest recorded points total in Chinese history for the division.

Name history
2014–2018 Zhenjiang Huasa F.C. 镇江华萨
2018– Kunshan F.C. 昆山FC

Players

Current squad

Coaching staff

Managerial history

  Li Dong (2016–2017)
  Dragan Stančić (caretaker) (2017)
  Goran Miscevic (2017)
  Li Xiao (2017)
  Tang Jing (2018)
  Dragan Okuka (2019)
  Gao Yao (2019–2021)
  Sergio Zarco Díaz (2021–)

Results
All-time league rankings

As of the end of 2021 season.

 In group stage.

Key
<div>

 Pld = Played
 W = Games won
 D = Games drawn
 L = Games lost
 F = Goals for
 A = Goals against
 Pts = Points
 Pos = Final position

 DNQ = Did not qualify
 DNE = Did not enter
 NH = Not Held
 – = Does Not Exist
 R1 = Round 1
 R2 = Round 2
 R3 = Round 3
 R4 = Round 4

 F = Final
 SF = Semi-finals
 QF = Quarter-finals
 R16 = Round of 16
 Group = Group stage
 GS2 = Second Group stage
 QR1 = First Qualifying Round
 QR2 = Second Qualifying Round
 QR3 = Third Qualifying Round

References

External links
 Official website 

Football clubs in China
Association football clubs established in 2014
2014 establishments in China